The 2014 Milton Keynes Council election took place on 22 May 2014 to elect members of Milton Keynes Council in England. This was on the same day as other local elections. The whole council (57 seats) was up for election due to a re-drawing of boundaries and an increase from 51 councillors. The council was under no overall control in advance of and after the vote.

After the election, the composition of the council was:
Conservative 18
Labour 25
Liberal Democrat 13
UK Independence Party 1

Election result

Ward results

See also
Milton Keynes Council elections for details of wards.

References

2014 English local elections
2014
2010s in Buckinghamshire